, officially called the , is one of the most prominent university ekiden (relay marathon) races of the year held between Tokyo and Hakone in Japan on January 2 and 3. The race is telecast on Nippon Television.

This two-day race from Ōtemachi to Hakone and back is separated into five legs on each day.  Due to slight variations in the courses, the first day distance is 107.5 km while the distance on the second day is 109.6 km.

Rules 
Five legs are provided between Tokyo and Hakone each way. Each runner runs one section, and alternates with the next runner at a station. Each team has ten runners, who each run with their team's sash which is handed over to the next runner on the team at each station.

If a runner cannot get to a station within a certain time after the leading team reaches it (10 minutes for legs 1–2, 15 minutes for legs 3–4, 20 minutes for all subsequent legs), the next runner starts with a substitute sash. The time difference is added to the goal time.

Participation 
Ten of them are seeded teams that qualify by virtue of finishing in the top ten the previous year. Ten more teams qualify through their team results at the Hakone Ekiden Yosenkai, a 20 km qualifier held in the October preceding the race.

Seed rights 
Teams who finished 10th place or better will be seeded and guarantees participation in the Hakone Ekiden for the next year.

Forfeiture 
If a runner retires en route to a station because of an accident, his team is treated as retired. Although runners for following sections may run, their times are not officially recorded.

Course

Day 1, January 2

Leg 1 (21.3 km) From Ōtemachi, Tokyo to Tsurumi, Yokohama

The race begins at 8:00a.m. in front of the Yomiuri Shimbun Building in Ōtemachi, Tokyo, and follows a relatively flat course along Hibiya-Dori and National Route 15 past various Tokyo landmarks such as Tokyo Imperial Palace, Tokyo Station, Hibiya Park, Zōjō-ji, and Tokyo Tower.

This is one of the most important sections because the first runner's rank affects the flow of the entire ekiden for his team. As a result, teams usually enter a strong runner run in this section.

Leg 2 (23.1 km) From Tsurumi to Totsuka

After departing the Tsurumi relay station, the runners reach Yokohama Station before following National Route 1 on their way to Totsuka relay station. As part of the traditional 53 Stations of the Tōkaidō, the runners will face a significant uphill climb at Gontazaka at the 13 km mark. The last 3 km section is also made up of a combination of uphill climbs and downhill descents.

As this is the longest leg of the race, the fastest runner in each team traditionally runs on this course as it has influence on the overall pace of the race.

Leg 3 (21.4 km) From Totsuka to Hiratsuka

The first 9 km of leg is marked with a gentle descent as the course gradually departs the urban areas towards the Shōnan coastline. The runners join National Route 134 at Chigasaki, and travel along the coastline with Mount Fuji in front of them and Sagami Bay to their left. Leg 3 finishes after the runners cross the Shonan Bridge over Sagami River, and reaches the Hiratsuka relay station on the coast.

Though considered to be the most scenic leg of the entire race, strong and sometimes unpredictable sea winds force runners to adapt as they exit the urban sections of the race. Like leg 2, leg 3 also often sees placements of the strongest runners of each team in order to keep pace.

Leg 4 (20.9 km) From Hiratsuka to Odawara

The shortest flat section of the race, leg 4 leads runners parallel to the Tokaido Main Line past towns of Ōiso and Ninomiya, before crossing the Sakawa River into the heart of Odawara. Passing by Odawara Castle, the last 3 km stretch of this leg sees a gradual uphill climb, a prelude to leg 5.

From 2006 to 2016, runners ran a shortened leg 4 at 18.5 km, the shortest of all legs, as organizers attempted to create a leg that would better highlight mid-distance runners of each team. However, the 20.9 km length was reinstated for the 2017 edition and has remained in place since.

Leg 5 (20.8 km) From Odawara to Lake Ashi, Hakone

After passing by Hakone-Yumoto Station, the runners run past (or in earlier editions, run through) the Kanreidoumon Gallery to begin their climbs, and pass by various Hakone sights such as the Fujiya Hotel, Hakone Kowakien, a railroad crossing for the Hakone Tozan Line, and Hakone Keimei Gakuen before reaching the highest point of National Route 1 at 16.2 km. Finally, the runners run through the town of Moto-Hakone under the Torii of Hakone Shrine at 19 km, and reach the finish line at Lake Ashi.

Colloquially called  , leg 5 is considered to be one of the most grueling sections of the race that sees runners climb up to 874 m at the highest point of leg. While almost all competitors forego tank tops and opt to dress in long sleeved apparel to combat the low temperatures, leg 5 sometimes sees runners fall to conditions such as hypothermia and hypoglycemia due to its trying nature. This leg often sees uphill specialists from each team being deployed, with many often only running this section for their universities throughout their collegiate career.

Day 2, January 3

Leg 6 (20.8 km) From Lake Ashi, Hakone to Odawara

Day 2 of the race begins at 8:00a.m. with leg 6 being a reverse course of leg 5 from day 1, and its first 4 km section is an uphill section before rapidly descending the mountains, past the same sights as those of leg 5. The teams' coaches are not allowed to join the teams until they have reached Hakone-Yumoto Station at the base of the mountain.

As a reverse of leg 5 and colloquially called  , the downhill leg 6 is a speedy and challenging affair with average runner speeds of 25 km per hour. Runners also need to combat the morning chills of starting early in the morning atop of the mountains, and icy and slippery course conditions are not uncommon dependent on weather conditions. As a combination of these challenging conditions, leg 6 also sees a high number of specialist runners much like leg 5, and those who participate often take tolls on their legs and feet as they reach the bottom of the mountain.

Leg 7 (21.3 km) From Odawara to Hiratsuka

A near-reverse course of leg 4, leg 7 is slightly longer than its parallel during day 1 and sees its runners leave the mountains and head to the coast near Hiratsuka on a mostly flat course with minor inclines after 9 km.

As the sun rises throughout the course of leg 7, the difference of temperature between the start in Odawara and the finish at Hiratsuka is the largest out of all other sections. Runners have to combat and adapt to the changing weather conditions as they move towards Hiratsuka.

Leg 8 (21.4 km) From Hiratsuka to Totsuka

A reverse course of leg 3, the first half of leg 8 is mostly flat, however near Fujisawa there is a significant uphill section near  which may causes some runners difficulties.

As the temperatures continue to rise, some runners fall into states of dehydration near Yugyōji-no-saka, and proper management of runners' physical conditions is critical in leading the way to a successful final 2 legs of the race.

Leg 9 (23.1 km) From Totsuka to Tsurumi

A reverse course of leg 2, leg 9 is the longest leg of day 2. After revisiting Gontazaka, now as a downhill section, the rest of the course past Hodogaya Station is a mostly flat affair leading to the Tsurumi relay station.

Like leg 2, Most teams place their second-best runners for this leg, and it is likewise called  to indicate its importance. The leg is critical for leading teams to cement their lead or for trailing teams to close their distance, either in a fight for the championship or a top-10 seeding position to guarantee their return to the next year's race. Owing to the strength of runners in this sections, overtakes are not uncommon during leg 9.

Additionally, the Tsurumi relay station at the end of leg 9 is the most common place for early starts to occur, as teams need to reach Tsurumi within 20 minutes of the race leaders to prevent a forced early start. Because of the symbolic importance of physically relaying the Tasuki to each teammate throughout the race, emotions often run high when teams fail to do so. The 160 m clear straight section at Tsurumi exacerbates this: teams close to the 20 minute cut-off physically see their teammates near the relay station, but not all teams make the successful exchange at this final relay station.

Leg 10 (23.0 km) From Tsurumi to Otemachi, Tokyo

A near-reverse course of leg 1, and similar to the opening leg, leg 10 is largely flat as runners head towards central Tokyo. After crossing Nihonbashi, the race returns and concludes in front of the Yomiuri Shimbun Building, where the finish line awaits.

The spectating crowds grow gradually as the race progresses through leg 10, and runners have to face strong winds between tall buildings as they enter more built-up areas of Tokyo. As the final runners of each team close out the race, their teammates awaits them at the finish line in celebration and reflection.

Origin
Hakone Ekiden was started in 1920.  Shizo Kanakuri, who is known as the father of the Japanese marathon, conceived the idea.  His enthusiastic idea of bringing up a runner who could compete in the world became the driving force of establishing Hakone Ekiden. When Kanaguri was a Tokyo Koto Shihan school (Koshi) student, he participated in Olympic Games in Stockholm in 1912 as one of the representative Japanese marathon runners.  He had to give up his race on the way, however.

In the meantime, the first ekiden,  was held in 1917 between Sanjō Ōhashi, Kyoto and  Tokyo, celebrating 50 years after Tokyo became the capital. This race was a big relay race between Kyoto and Tokyo (516 km) held by Yomiuri Shimbun for three days. It succeeded and became the original form of Hakone Ekiden. Kanaguri was influenced by the success of the race and persuaded many universities that they should race in the Hakone Ekiden.  As a result, Waseda Univ., Keio Univ., Meiji Univ. and Tokyo Kōshi replied to his offer and Hakone Ekiden started. Hakone Ekiden was started with great energy of the pioneers in Japanese sports society. It started during World War I, so industrial areas gradually expanded to the west and the Tokaido road was widened.  Reflecting this active atmosphere, the Japanese sports society, including ekiden one, were developing great challenging spirits at that time.

Level of competition in 2010 
In the 2010 (86th) race, of the 380 athletes (190 runners and 190 alternates) that represent the 19 universities, 328 have run under 14:40 for 5,000 meters; 150 at 14:20 and 33 under 14:00.　This figure compares very strongly with US collegiate men from all schools: athletic.net's list of collegiate men 5000 meters in 2009, which lists approximately 400 athletes at 14:40, 200 at 14:20 and 60 under 14:00 in 2009. Stepping up to the 10,000 meter distance, the same sources show that these 19 Tokyo universities list over 190 runners with personal bests under 30:00 (14 more sub 30 minute runners make up an all-star team of runners from other Tokyo universities); about 90 US collegians ran under 30:00 in 2009.

Winners

Shizo Kanakuri Trophy 
This prize is awarded to the most valuable runner. This was founded in 2004(80th) to admire Shizo Kanakuri's accomplishment.

Titles

Records

Competition Records 
Following are the current competition overall records.

Section Time Records 
Following are the time record for each of the section from the current course in effect.

Overtake Records

Triple Crown 
Winning the previous year's Izumo Ekiden and the All Japan University Ekiden  at the same time is awarded the Triple Crown.

The following 5 universities have achieved this.

In popular culture 
 Run with the Wind is a 2006 Japanese novel by Shion Miura that narrates the build-up and training of a team to run the Hakone Ekiden. It has been adapted to manga, live action film and anime.

See also 

Izumo Ekiden
All Japan University Ekiden

References

External links 
 

Ekiden
Road running competitions in Japan
Recurring sporting events established in 1920
Sport in Kanagawa Prefecture
Sports competitions in Tokyo
Hakone, Kanagawa
Men's athletics competitions
Winter events in Japan
Athletics in Tokyo